San Joaquin, officially the Municipality of San Joaquin, is a 2nd class municipality in the province of Iloilo, Philippines. According to the 2020 census, it has a population of 52,617 people.

Geography
San Joaquin is located in the southern tip of Iloilo Province. One of the rivers that traverse the town is the Siwaragan River with Barangay Siwaragan and Bucaya situated in its mouth.

Climate

Barangays
San Joaquin is subdivided into 85 barangays.

Demographics

Kinaray-a is the main language of San Joaquin. Hiligaynon is spoken as a secondary language and is also understood by the residents.

Economy

Landmarks

San Joaquin Church

The main church in town, a Roman Catholic parish was constructed in 1859 and completed in 1869 by Spanish friar Tomas Santaren, of the Augustinian Order. The church is unique among those in the Philippines for its large pediment featuring a military scene, the Spanish victory over the Moors in the Battle of Tetuan. The National Museum of the Philippines listed the church as a National Cultural Treasure.

San Joaquin Cemetery

The San Joaquin Cemetery is located along the main highway in San Joaquin Town. The construction of San Joaquin Cemetery was commenced by Fray Mariano Vamba, the last Augustinian parish priest of the town in 1892. A statue of Jesus with his arms outstretched stands on top of a baroque style gate, and on each side of Christ, two columns with angelic figures are poised as guards. In addition, sculpted heads of two cherubs and a skull representing death marks the entrance of the cemetery.  Twenty stone steps after entering the gate and you will be greeted by the Baroque designed mortuary chapel standing on the center.

Culture
The Bayluhay Festival, celebrated every third week of January, reflects the town's unique mixture of races and cultures. Historical and religious themes, mostly anchored from the Barter of Panay, such as efforts with the preservation of rituals, are reflected through the dances presented in the festivity. Accentuated every annual municipal fiesta is the “Pasungay” or bull fight. During this affair, the best bulls from the different barangays are pitted against each other by weight category in a “bull derby”.

Tourism
The Talisayan Beach Resort is a privately owned beach resort located in the Poblacion. The Cata-an Cove and Tobog Beach Resort in Barangay Cata-an, about 10 kilometers from the Poblacion, is a place perfect for scuba diving and weekend outings.

Garin Farm, a 15 hectare privately owned farm resort in Purok 2, Poblacion which showcases agriculture,leisure and pilgrimage theme. Practical and intelligent farming are imparted to the visitors through the agricultural techniques and innovative technologies applied in the demo farm. The resort leisure amenities include a swimming pool, a 5,000 sq.m man-made lagoon located on a hilltop, with fishes and lilies which offers fishing, boating and kayaking, and a 300 meters zip- line which goes over the lagoon and through the trees. On the top of the hill sits the 101 Feet Divine Mercy Cross, which can be accessed by a 456 step stairway. Along the stairway are life-size and lifelike statues depicting the Creation, Noah's Ark, Ten Commandments, and the 9 Major Events of the Life of Jesus Christ.

Education
The town has 11 high schools. Two (2) of which are located in Poblacion.

 Don Felix Serra National High School (Mother School)(Poblacion)
 San Joaquin School of Fisheries (Poblacion)
 Tiolas National High School
 Lawigan National High School
 Valverde National High School
 Escalantera National High School
 Sinogbuhan National High School
 Bad-as National High School
 Ginot-an National High School
 Pitogo National High School
 Sta. Ana National High School

References

External links

 [ Philippine Standard Geographic Code]
 Philippine Census Information
 San Joaquin on Local Governance Performance Management System
 

Municipalities of Iloilo